The 1968 U.S. Open was the 68th U.S. Open, held June 13–16 at the East Course of Oak Hill Country Club in Rochester, New York. Lee Trevino equaled the tournament scoring record and won the first of his six major titles, four strokes ahead of runner-up Jack Nicklaus. It was also the first win on the PGA Tour for Trevino, age 28.

This was the second of three U.S. Opens at the East Course; Cary Middlecoff won the first in 1956 and Curtis Strange successfully defended in 1989. It also hosted the PGA Championship in 1980, 2003, and 2013, and the Ryder Cup in 1995.

Final round
Bert Yancey held the 54-hole lead after a tournament record 205 (−5) in the first three rounds. Trevino was a stroke behind at 206, after three rounds in the 60s, and made par saves at 5 and 6. After Yancey bogeyed the 5th, Trevino took the lead, then recorded birdies at 11 and 12, while Yancey bogeyed the 11th to fall out of contention. Nicklaus started the round seven strokes back at 212 (+2); he got two quick birdies, but did not record another until the 14th, by which time Trevino already had a commanding lead. Trevino's total of 275 tied the tournament record that Nicklaus established the year before at Baltusrol; his four rounds in the 60s was a tournament first, and did not happen again for a quarter century, until Lee Janzen won at Baltusrol in 1993. It was also the first of Trevino's 29 victories on the PGA Tour. Of Trevino's six major victories, Nicklaus was the runner-up four times.

Sam Snead, age 56, finished in a tie for 9th place, his final top-10 finish at the U.S. Open.

Past champions in the field

Made the cut

Missed the cut 

Source:

Round summaries

First round
Thursday, June 13, 1968

Second round
Friday, June 14, 1968

Third round
Saturday, June 15, 1968

Final round
Sunday, June 16, 1968

Source:

Scorecard

Cumulative tournament scores, relative to par

Source:

References

External links
USGA Championship Database

U.S. Open (golf)
Golf in New York (state)
Sports in Rochester, New York
U.S. Open
U.S. Open (golf)
U.S. Open golf
U.S. Open golf
Events in Rochester, New York